Elections in the Mexican Federal District (Mexico City) were held on Sunday, 2 July 2006. Voters went the polls to elect, on the local level:

A new Head of Government of the Federal District, to serve a six-year term, replacing current incumbent Alejandro Encinas.
66 new deputies to the Legislative Assembly.
16 borough mayors.

Results

Head of Government of the Federal District election

The winner of the Head of Government contest was Marcelo Ebrard of the Party of the Democratic Revolution, in alliance with the Labor Party and Convergence (the "Alliance for the Good of All"). The Federal District Electoral Institute (IEDF) formally announced his victory on 5 July 2006 and presented him with his certificate of majority.

Borough Mayors
In the sixteen borough mayoral races, the PRD-led alliance was victorious in fourteen (the thirteen it already held, plus Milpa Alta gained from the PRI), with the PAN retaining the two (Benito Juárez, D.F. and Miguel Hidalgo, D.F.) that it had won in the 2003 election.

Legislative Assembly
The PRD-led alliance won in 36 of the 40 single-member local constituencies for the Legislative Assembly, with the PAN winning the other four. The additional 26 deputies assigned on the basis of proportional representation in accordance with the parties' total vote numbers were distributed as follows: PAN, 12; PRI, 4; PVEM, 4; Nueva Alianza, 4; and Alternativa, 2.

Polls

Federal District
Mexico City elections